Oakley is a surname of English origin, and may refer to:

People
Alan Oakley (journalist), English journalist and magazine editor
Alexander Oakley (born 1926), Canadian racewalker
Ann Oakley (born 1944), British sociologist, feminist, and writer
Annie Oakley (1860–1926), American sharpshooter and exhibition shooter
Anthony Oakley (born 1981), American football player
Ben Oakley (born 1988), English canoeist
Berry Oakley (1948–1972), American musician, founding member of The Allman Brothers Band
Bill Oakley (born 1966), American television writer; known for work on The Simpsons
Bill Oakley (artist) (1964–2004), comic book letterer
Brian Oakley (1927–2012), British civil servant and director of the 1980s Alvey Programme
Charles Oakley (born 1963), American basketball player
Charles Oakley (American football) (born 1931), American football player
David Oakley (1945–2006), American golfer
Francis Christopher Oakley (born 1931), English-American educator and historian
Graham Oakley (born 1929), English author and illustrator
Isabel Cooper-Oakley (born 1853), Indian-born theosophist and author
James Oakley (disambiguation), several people
Jarrad Oakley-Nicholls (born 1988), Australian football player
Kenneth Oakley (1911–1981), English physical anthropologist, geologist, and paleontologist
Laura Oakley (1879–1957), American silent film actress
Mark Oakley (born 1968), Church of England Archdeacon of Germany and Northern Europe
Matthew Oakley (born 1977), English football player
Norman Oakley (1939–2016), English footballer
Pete Oakley (born 1949), American golfer
Peter Oakley (1927–2014), Internet celebrity
Phyllis E. Oakley (1934-2022), American diplomat
Robert B. Oakley (1931–2014), American professional diplomat and ambassador
Robin Oakley (born 1941), British journalist and political editor for CNN and BBC
Roger Oakley (born 1943), New Zealand actor
Ross Oakley (born 1942), Australian businessman; chief of the Victorian Football League and Australian Football League
Sarah Oakley (born 1974), Royal Navy officer 
Shane Oakley, English illustrator and comic book artist
Sundra Oakley (born 1975), Jamaican-American actress and reality-television participant
Thomas Oakley (disambiguation), several people
Violet Oakley (1874–1961), American artist and art teacher
William Oakley (1873–1934), English football player
William Oakley (Medal of Honor) (1857–1918), American Medal of Honor recipient

See also
A. Oakey Hall (1826–1898), Mayor of New York City, name often misspelled "Oakley"
Oakley Hoopes Bailey (1843–1947), prolific panoramic map creator

Fictional person
Sting Oakley, character in the anime series Gundam SEED Destiny

English-language surnames
Surnames of English origin
English toponymic surnames